Patzelt is a surname. Notable people with the surname include:

 Heinz Patzelt (born 1957), Austrian lawyer
 Karl Patzelt (1893–1918), Austro-Hungarian flying ace
 Martin Patzelt (born 1947), German politician